Barbara Nachtrieb (Grimes) Armstrong (August 4, 1890 - January 18, 1976) was a lawyer and law professor in California.  She was the first woman to serve as a law professor at a law school of a major university, at the University of California, Berkeley School of Law in 1923, and in 1935 was the second woman to become a full professor of law at an ABA-approved, AALS-member college, two years after Harriet Spiller Daggett at Louisiana State University; a third female tenured law professor was not appointed until Margaret Harris Amsler at Baylor University Law School in 1941. She advocated social insurance throughout her career, and she is considered the architect of the US Social Security system.

Early life
She was born in San Francisco.  Her parents were born in the Midwest, descended from German immigrants.  She, her sister and two brothers attended local public schools.  She them studied economics at University of California, Berkeley, graduating with a BA in 1913.  She moved on to law school, where she was one of only two women in her class, and received a JD from Boalt Hall, the University of California's School of Jurisprudence, in 1915.  She was admitted to the California Bar the same year.

Career
She practiced law and was also executive secretary of the California Social Insurance Commission from 1915 to 1919.

She returned to Berkeley in 1917 to study for a PhD in economics.  She was appointed to a joint position on the faculty of the school of law and of the department of economics at Berkeley in 1919, the first woman faculty member at a law school approved by the American Bar Association.

She married Lymon Grimes in 1920, and received her PhD in 1921.  Her daughter Patricia was born in 1922.  She became an assistant professor in 1923 but was divorced in 1925.  She remarried in 1926, to Ian Armstrong. She traveled in Europe in 1926 and 1927, studying social insurance systems.

She became an associate professor at Berkeley in 1928, and moved to the law faculty permanently, to teach law full-time.  She was the first woman to become a full-time faculty member at a major US law school.

She published a book Insuring the Essentials:Minimum Wage Program in 1932, and became Chief of Staff for Social Security Planning of the Committee on Economic Security (CES), in 1934.   She helped to draft the Social Security Act of 1935.

She was promoted to full professor in 1935.  During the Second World War she was the head of the Rent Enforcement Division of the San Francisco District Office of the US Office of Price Administration.

She published a two-volume work on community property in 1953, and became the A.F. and May T. Morrison Professor of Law in 1955.  She officially retired in 1957, but continued to work as a Professor Emeritus until 1965.  She was attacked and severely beaten in 1970, and suffered from recurrent pain for the next six years.  She died at her home in Oakland.

References
 In Memoriam, California Law Review 1977
 Notable American Women: A Biographical Dictionary Completing the Twentieth Century, Volume 5, Susan Ware, Harvard University Press, 2004, p. 28-29
 Civic and Moral Learning in America, Donald Warren, John Patrick, Palgrave Macmillan, 2006, p. 160-166
 Barbara Nachtrieb Armstrong, Law: Berkeley, Calisphere, University of California
 Berkeley Law Scholarship Repository, "The Future of Women Law Professors", by Herma Hill Kay, Berkeley Law (January 1, 1991);
 Barbara Armstrong - first female law professor

1890 births
1976 deaths
American women academics
Lawyers from San Francisco
UC Berkeley College of Letters and Science alumni
20th-century American women lawyers
20th-century American lawyers